Mohamed Zbir (born 1 November 1965) is a Moroccan boxer. He competed at the 1992 Summer Olympics and the 1996 Summer Olympics. At the 1992 Summer Olympics, he lost to Jan Quast of Germany.

References

1965 births
Living people
Moroccan male boxers
Olympic boxers of Morocco
Boxers at the 1992 Summer Olympics
Boxers at the 1996 Summer Olympics
Place of birth missing (living people)
Light-flyweight boxers